Although many of the largest restaurant chains in Canada are US-based (McDonald's and Yum! Brands among others), some Canadian-based (owned and operated from Canada) restaurant chains are growing and have expanded into other markets, especially into the USA.

Major chains

241 Pizza 

241 Pizza was founded in Toronto in 1986. Since then, 241 Pizza has expanded across Ontario, and has locations in Newfoundland and Saskatchewan.

A&W (Canada) 

A&W Restaurants entered the Canadian market in 1956.  In 1972, the American company sold the Canadian unit to Unilever thus creating A&W (Canada).  In 1995, it was spun off into an independent entity with no ties to its American counterpart.  They have over 800 locations nationwide.

Bâton Rouge (restaurant)

BeaverTails/Queues de Castor

BeaverTails pastry (or Queues de Castor pâtisserie in Quebec) is a chain of pastry stands operated by BeaverTails Canada Inc. The chain's namesake product is a line of fried dough pastries, individually hand-stretched to resemble a beaver's tail. The chain began in Ottawa and now has franchises and licensees in six countries: Canada (Atlantic Canada, Ontario, Alberta, Manitoba, British Columbia and Quebec), the United States, Japan, France, U.A.E., and Mexico.

Ben & Florentine 

Ben & Florentine is a Canadian breakfast and lunch restaurant chain, serving around 2.5 million customers per year. The founders used characteristics from their own families to create the concept of the chain. Each Ben & Florentine restaurant is owned individually as a franchise. Ben & Florentine was founded in 2008 in Saint-Laurent, Quebec and the first restaurant opened in Vaudreuil-Dorion, Quebec. By 2011, it had 16 locations in the province of Quebec. The chain has been a CFA member since 2010. The restaurant chain began by serving an extensive breakfast and lunch menu, and later extended hours to include dinner selections. In 2012 the chain expanded into Ontario, and by 2014 there were 31 locations. In 2015, the chain had 43 franchise units.

Big Smoke Burger

Booster Juice

Boston Pizza

Boston Pizza (branded as simply Boston's outside of Canada) has franchised 396 restaurants in North America. Boston Pizza International Inc. was Canada's number one casual dining brand with more than 340 restaurants in Canada and system-wide sales of $831 million in 2008. Annually, Boston Pizza serves more than 40 million guests.
 The first Boston Pizza location was opened in Edmonton, Alberta in 1964 by Gus Agioritis under the name "Boston Pizza and Spaghetti House". It took 32 years to open its first 100 locations, and eight years for the next 100. The current owners of the restaurant chain, Jim Treliving and George Melville, purchased the company in 1983, 15 years after Treliving bought his first franchise, and 10 years after he first partnered with Melville. Store sales growth has averaged 6.3% for the last decade compared to the industry average of 2.2%.

Cactus Club Cafe

C-Lovers Fish & Chips

C-Lovers Fish & Chips are fish and chips franchises in Western Canada. It offers all-you-can-eat fish and chips, and serves ocean-wise seafood and locally sourced ingredients. Every December, C-Lovers restaurants donate $1 from each Prawn Madness dish to the BC Children's Hospital Foundation. In 2012, the restaurant served about 150,000 prawns, and since 2003 donated $86,000 to the Foundation.

Chairman's Brands

Chairman's Brands is a privately held corporation dedicated to the franchising, development, and marketing of quick-service restaurants. Until 2006, its main operation was Coffee Time with operations in Canada, Greece, Poland, China, Qatar and Saudi Arabia. The chain's first store was opened in 1982 by Tom Michalopoulos in Bolton, Ontario. In October 2006, the company doubled in size, when it purchased the Afton Food Group, a company whose assets included Robin's Donuts, 241 Pizza and Mrs. Powell's Cinnamon Buns. The company also operates Eggsmart, and The Friendly Greek. In all, Chairman's Brands operates more than 500 stores across Canada under its seven brands.

As of November 15, 2016, they operated eight brands with over 440 locations in five countries.  The brands were 241 Pizza, Coffee Time, Eggsmart, Mia Fresco, New Orleans Pizza, Robin's, and The Friendly Greek.

Chez Ashton 

Chez Ashton is a regional fast food restaurant in Quebec that is famous for its poutine. Chez Ashton was started as a travelling snack cart  by Ashton Leblond in 1969. In 1972, poutine was first offered. Leblond hooked his customers by giving free samples of his poutine. The enterprise grew in popularity until Leblond was able to open a restaurant with a dining room open year-round in 1976. The franchise has grown to include 25 restaurants in the Quebec City region.

Coffee Time

Cora

Cora, based in Montreal, has 128 restaurants and was started by Cora Tsouflidou in 1987. It can be found in every Canadian province. In 2008, the restaurant changed its name from Cora's breakfast and lunch (in French, Chez Cora déjeuners) to Cora. Serving such breakfast items as eggs, crepes and French toast, it is known for its all day breakfast and heaping mounds of fruit.

Crabby Joe's Tap & Grill

Country Style
Country Style is a chain of coffee stores operating primarily in the province of Ontario.

Cows Ice Cream

Cows is a chain of ice cream parlours and cheesemongers with nine locations in Canada and one in the United States. It started in 1983 in Prince Edward Island as an ice cream parlour. Today it is known for its 32 varieties of ice cream, cheddar cheese, and cow-themed merchandise. Sales of Cows ice cream spiked in the summer of 2010, after American television hosts Regis and Kelly showed interest in the chain.

La Diperie 
La Diperie is an ice cream chain created in 2014 in Montreal by Sam Arif. In 2016, MTY Food Group acquired 60% of the ice cream chain.

Dixie Lee Fried Chicken

Donut Diner 

Former restaurant closed in 2005.

Druxy's

Dunn's

Earls

East Side Mario's 

East Side Mario's is an Italian restaurant chain, with headquarters located in Mississauga, Ontario. Most of the 85 locations are featured in Eastern Canada

Edo Japan

Eggspectation 
Eggspectation is a restaurant chain originally focused on breakfast and brunch that started in Montreal in 1993. In Canada they have locations in Quebec, Ontario, and British Columbia, and there are additional locations in the United States, Egypt, Pakistan, Qatar, and United Arab Emirates.

Eggsquis 
Eggsquis is a midscale chain of restaurants in Quebec and Ontario, with 39 outlets as of 2018, mainly in Quebec. It specializes in egg dishes, from bacon and eggs to omelettes. The first Eggsquis restaurant was opened by Elias Stergiou in Sherbrooke, in 1995. In 2010 the owners of the restaurant chain Chez Cora took Eggsquis to court, claiming that some of the dishes at its Mascouche location had been copied from Cora's, including the names of the dishes.

Elephant and Castle Pub and Restaurant

Freshii

Gabriel Pizza

The Great Canadian Bagel

Grinner's Food Systems Limited

Grinners Food Systems Limited, the franchiser of Greco Pizza (since 1981) and Captain Sub, is a Truro, Nova Scotia-based company. It is owned by Trucorp Investments Incorporated. Trucorp, headquartered in Dieppe, New Brunswick, also owns Bonte Foods Limited, Frank and Gino's Restaurants, and Chris Brothers food products.

Established in Moncton, New Brunswick in 1977, Greco Pizza is one of Atlantic Canada's largest pizza chains. Menu items include pizza, donair, salads, garlic fingers, and the restaurant's proprietary dipping sauces. Many of the over 170 locations in Quebec, Ontario, New Brunswick, Nova Scotia, and Newfoundland operate co-branded with Captain Submarine. Both are quick-service restaurants.

Captain Submarine was acquired by Grinner's in 2002, when it only had 9 locations (21 fewer than it had in the 1980s). Many of the stores franchised since then also sell Greco Pizza items. The purchase brought the number of Grinners franchised restaurants from 111 to 120.

Harvey's

Hero Certified Burgers

Hero Certified Burgers is a quick service restaurant franchise chain that operates in Canada, with locations concentrated in Southern Ontario. The chain was founded in 2004 by John Lettieri, who opened the first store in Hazelton Lanes in Yorkville, Toronto, Ontario. Lettieri also owns the restaurant chain Lettieri café, based in Toronto. The company was the first Canadian franchise to focus on the provision of fast foods using food products from vendors that adhere to sustainable practices.

Imvescor Restaurants Inc

Imvescor was the parent company of the restaurant chains Scores, Pizza Delight, Mikes, Baton Rouge with a history that goes back to 1968. It was known as Pizza Delight Corporation until 2007, when the name was changed to Imvescor.
As Pizza Delight Corporation, the company purchased Mikes in 2000 for $14.5 million, Quebec company Scores Rotisserie Barbecue and Ribs in 2005 for $32 million and Baton Rouge Restaurants. 
Headquartered in Moncton, the company was in charge of 259 restaurants across Canada (101 Pizza Delight, 91 Mikes, 39 Scores, and 28 Baton Rouge).

Imvescor used to be a privately owned corporation that held the licence for the trademark and intellectual property of the four restaurants by PDM Royalties Income Fund. In 2009, the income fund and Imvescor combined their businesses into a new corporation called Imvescor Restaurant Group Inc.
The four restaurant chains employed over 10,000 people.
Total system sales in 2009 were $324.8 million.  Imvescor is now owned by MTY Food Group, after being acquired in December 2017.

Jack Astor's Bar and Grill

JOEY

Joey's Seafood Restaurants

The Keg

Kelsey's Neighbourhood Bar & Grill

King of Donair

La Belle Province

Lafleur Restaurants

Mary Brown's

Mary Brown's operated mainly in Newfoundland (about 20 locations with 1 location in Halifax and 1 in Ontario) until the late 1970s, when it began expanding in Ontario, Alberta and Nova Scotia. In 2010, there were 38 locations in Newfoundland and Labrador, 30 locations in Ontario, 12 in Alberta and 3 in Nova Scotia, for an approximate total of 83. As of 2017, Mary Brown's has expanded into the United States, specifically in Florida. Drive-through and delivery services are available at some locations.

The restaurant chain, started by Newfoundlanders Pat Tarrant and Cyril Fleming in 1969, was named after Mary Brown, the wife of a fried chicken recipe creator. The headquarters are in Markham, Ontario.

Mandarin Restaurant

Mikes

Milestones Grill and Bar

Montana's Cookhouse

Moxies

Mr. Mike's 

Mr. Mike's SteakhouseCasual is a chain of restaurants in Western Canada. It began as a steakhouse where the most popular item on the menu was the Mikeburger, which consisted of grilled steak served on a fresh French loaf with garlic butter and the secret Mike Sauce. It has since evolved to a casual dining arrangement with a "West Coast feel". Mr. Mike's now features a broad menu and full liquor licence, and targets a different demographic.
 Their first restaurant in Eastern Canada opened in Welland Ontario on November 21, 2017.

MTY Food Group

MTY Food Group is the parent company of 28 different franchising brands including Yogen Fruz Canada (operates locations as master franchisee), Mucho Burrito, Mr. Sub, Tiki Ming, Mrs. Vanelli's, Taco Time, Country Style, Thai Express, and Tandori. Founded by Stanley Ma, originally from Hong Kong, in 1979 when he opened his first restaurant Le Paradis du Pacifique in Montreal; the company incorporated in 1984 and joined the Toronto Stock Exchange in 2010. Most of the company's growth has come through acquisitions, but MTY has also launched at least 10 of the franchises.
The 25-year-old company oversees 2251 (up from 1741 in 2010) quick service restaurants (excluding Mr. Sub locations, about 35 of MTY's locations are corporately run.) Its latest acquisitions are Jugo Juice and Groupe Valentine. System-wide sales increased 17.5% in 2010 while the number of locations rose by 57, or 10%.

New York Fries

Nickels Grill & Bar

Normandin

Dine-in and take-out restaurant chain founded in Neufchâtel, Quebec, in 1969. As of 2020, the chain had more than 40 restaurants in Quebec.

Nuburger

Originally founded as Unburger, name changed due to confusion over being a non-vegetarian outfit. Operates 4 locations in Winnipeg, MB

The Old Spaghetti Factory

OPA! of Greece

OPA! started with a single food court location in Calgary's Market Mall, where they served classic Greek dishes made using high-quality ingredients. Twenty years later (franchising since 2001), OPA! has grown from a single restaurant to a chain with over 100 locations from Vancouver Island to Ontario, including three university locations; the University of Calgary, the University of Alberta, and Macewan's SAMU Campus as well as the new YYC Airport US Departures terminal in Calgary.

Osmow's Shawarma 

Osmow's Shawarma is a franchised quick-serve shawarma restaurant that has over 120 locations throughout North America.

Panago

Panago (originally Panagopoulos) is a privately owned quick service pizza chain with 174 franchised locations in Canada, 151 of which are in British Columbia and Alberta. It is headquartered in Abbotsford, BC where in 1986 the first three stores opened.

In recent years it has attempted to make its food healthier as provincial healthier eating guidelines became more strict. Offerings include multigrain crusts, salads, 33 pizza toppings, and other menu items that have no trans fat, MSG, artificial flavours or artificial colours.

The Pantry

Pizza Delight

Pizza Nova

Pizza Nova is a primarily Ontario-based pizza chain founded in 1963 by Sam Primucci with more than 150 restaurants.

Pizza Pizza

Pizza Pizza is a primarily Ontario-based pizza chain founded in 1967 by Michael Overs with more than 700 traditional and non-traditional restaurants coast to coast with over 3,000 employees.  Its sister brand is western chain, Pizza 73. Pizza Pizza fills approximately 29 million orders annually and has won a Webby for their iPhone App.

Pür & Simple
Pür & Simple is a Canadian chain of restaurants specializing in breakfast and lunch. Founded in 2016, the brand is operated under the Eat It! Brands portfolio.

Recipe Unlimited

Recipe Unlimited (previously known as Cara Operations) operates Harvey's, Swiss Chalet, Montana's Cookhouse, Kelsey's Neighbourhood Bar & Grill and other brands. The company also provides catering services to airlines. The revenue for its 1200 restaurants and its airline solutions division in 2008 was over $2 billion.

Cara Airline Solutions operated about 10 flight kitchens across Canada that served more than 50 air carriers and rail travel customers, it was sold to Gategroup in 2010.

Montana's Cookhouse started in 1995, was acquired by Cara in 2002, and operates 90 restaurants across Canada.

There are 200 Swiss Chalet restaurants in Canada and the US.

New York Fries is another Recipe Unlimited brand with about 200 stores in Canada, Hong Kong, UAE, Kuwait, and South Korea. New York Fries also had a burger company called South St. Burger, that sells burgers along with New York Fries and other products. It was spun off into a separate entity as part of the Cara acquisition.

The largest Canadian-established hamburger chain in the nation, Harvey's was founded in Richmond Hill, Ontario, in 1959, it has franchises from Vancouver to St. John's, though most its restaurants are concentrated in southern Ontario and southern Quebec.

On March 31, 2016, Cara announced that it would acquire the St-Hubert chain of rotisserie chicken restaurants in the summer of 2016.

Recipe Unlimited also owns Prime Restaurants, the parent company of the restaurant chains East Side Mario's, Casey's, Pat and Mario's, Fionn MacCool's and Bier Markt Esplanade. Co-founded in Sudbury in 1980 by Bernard C. Dyer and Nicholas Perpick, the Mississauga-based company operates in Canada and the US. Prime Restaurants was acquired by Fairfax Financial, and many of their East Side Mario's locations have either closed or been converted to Prime Pubs. The Pat and Mario's restaurants have been closed.

Richtree Market

Shoeless Joe's

Salisbury House

Scores

Smoke's Poutinerie

St. Louis Bar and Grill

St. Louis Bar and Grill is a casual sports bar which was founded in Toronto in 1992 and has expanded to over 70 locations across Canada, with locations in Ontario, Alberta, New Brunswick and Nova Scotia.

Stellas

Founded in 1999, Winnipeg, MB based Stellas operates 8 locations throughout the city.

St-Hubert

Laval, Quebec-based St-Hubert operates 97 restaurants in Canada, making it the 16th largest restaurant chain in the country. It used to have many locations outside of Quebec, but withdrew to only in Quebec and Ottawa area. Swiss Chalet has taken advantage of that, growing into more locations, but has narrowed its presence in Quebec. Its unique brand of gravy is one of more than 600 products it sells through grocery stores in eastern Canada. It serves more than 31 million meals every year, including 3.2 million kilograms of cabbage, 6.062 million kilograms of French fries, and 8.3 million servings of desserts.

On March 31, 2016, Cara Operations announced that it would acquire the St-Hubert chain of rotisserie chicken restaurants in the summer of 2016.

Second Cup 

Second Cup Coffee Co. is a Canadian specialty coffee retailer operating more than 345 cafes across the country. Its headquarters are in Mississauga, Ontario. Its stores sell hot and cold beverages, pastries, snacks, pre-packaged food items, hot and cold sandwiches, and drinkware, including mugs and tumblers. Second Cup sales continue to compete with Starbucks, Tim Hortons and McDonald's, which also feature espresso-based specialty drinks.

Since its inception, Second Cup has expanded its franchises to the United States, Morocco, Saudi Arabia, Bahrain, Kuwait, Oman, Qatar, Lebanon, Jordan, Egypt, the United Arab Emirates, Iraq, Syria, Yemen, Cyprus, Azerbaijan, Angola, Lithuania, and Romania. It also opened a store in Pakistan in 2013, in the United Kingdom in 2014, in the Philippines in 2015, and in Poland in 2016.

Smitty's Family Restaurants

Smitty's Family Restaurants First opened in 1960, Smitty's operates 82 restaurants in Canada, and was one of the first ever franchise model restaurants in the country. Smitty's Restaurants are family owned and operated, and are well known for their all day breakfast, lunch and dinner offerings. Their taglines of All Your Favourites. All Day Long. and Canada's Family Restaurant are represented in a vast menu of choices for every age.

Sunset Grill

Swiss Chalet

Symposium Cafe

Thaï Express

Tim Hortons

Tim Hortons first store opened on May 17, 1964, in Hamilton, Ontario. Tim Hortons is currently owned by Restaurant Brands International. It is the fourth largest publicly traded quick-service restaurant chain in North America based on market capitalization, and the largest in Canada. It has cornered the Canadian market for baked goods (76%) and coffee (62% compared to Starbucks, in the number two position, at 7%). The company has experienced substantial growth in the United States, where it has 613 stores (April 2011, about 220 more than it had in June 2008). It has a same-store sales growth rate of 3.9% in Canada and 4.9% in the US. The new partnership with Cold Stone Creamery helped push its US presence to over 600 stores. The partnership has since dissolved. Sales exceeded $2 billion in 2008. It was controlled by Wendy's International Inc. for 11 of the 46 years of operation, from August 8, 1995, until the end of 2006. On April 3, 2011, Tim Hortons oversaw 3,782 locations in North America 3,169 of which were in Canada.

In the fourth quarter of 2010 Tim Hortons' profits were 27% more than they were over the entire 2009 fiscal year (for the quarter net income was up 314%).

In Forbes 2011 edition of the world's 2000 largest companies, Tim Hortons placed 1469th overall (up from 1714th in 2010) with annual sales of $2.6 billion (up from $2.014 billion in 2010), profits totalling $628 million (up from $280 million), assets worth $2.5 billion (up from $1.90 billion) and a market value of $7.5 billion (up from $5.41 billion). The data is from the year ending January 2, and market value is from March 11, 2011.

Urban Sparq Hospitality
Edmonton restaurant group that owns 7 restaurant brands in Western Canada, Minneapolis and Halifax.  Banners include The Pint (7 locations), Knoxville's (2 locations), Beercade, The Denizen Hall, Crash Hotel, Argyle Bar & Grill, and Arena Liquor store.

Wild Wing Restaurants

Wimpy's Diner

White Spot

The Works
The Works is a full service, licensed, casual dining restaurant chain with outdoor work themes (road signs, street lights, traffic lights, fences, tools, hydro meters, etc.).  This Ottawa based chain has 27 locations in Ontario, and the restaurant's main menu feature is burgers.  It offers six kinds of patties and over 50 types of toppings including peanut butter, deep fried bacon, Kraft dinner and seven kinds of cheese. It is also known for its Tower-O-Rings appetizer, with 12 large onion rings that comes with two dipping sauces.

See also

Lists of restaurants
List of fast-food chains in Canada
List of restaurant chains in the United States

References

Restaurants
Lists of restaurants by country